A variety of currencies are tender in the United Kingdom, its overseas territories and crown dependencies. This list covers all of those currently in circulation.

References

See also

 Sterling area
 Bank of England
 Currencies of the British West Indies
 International status and usage of the euro
 Commonwealth banknote-issuing institutions
 List of countries by leading trade partners
 List of Commonwealth of Nations countries by GDP
 List of stock exchanges in the United Kingdom, the British Crown Dependencies and United Kingdom Overseas Territories

Banknotes of British Overseas Territories
Currencies of British Overseas Territories
Currencies of the Commonwealth of Nations
Currencies of the Crown Dependencies
Currencies of the United Kingdom
Pound sterling
Pound sterling
Currency lists
Currencies of the United States
Trade blocs
Currency unions
Fixed exchange rate
Economy of the Organisation of Eastern Caribbean States
Currencies of the Caribbean
Currencies of North America
Currencies of South America
Currencies of Europe
Currencies of Africa
Currencies of Asia
Currencies of Oceania
Economy of the Cayman Islands
Currencies